Alexis Arnaldus Gilliland (born August 10, 1931 in Bangor, Maine) is an American science fiction writer and cartoonist. He resides in Arlington, Virginia.

Gilliland won the John W. Campbell Award for Best New Writer in 1982, notably beating David Brin and Michael Swanwick for the honor.  Gilliland also won four Hugo Awards for Best Fan Artist (1980, 1983, 1984, 1985), the Rotsler Award (Lifetime Achievement in Fan Cartooning) in 2006, and the Tucker Award (for Excellence in Partying) in 1988.

He and his first wife Dolly (died 1991) hosted meetings of science fiction fans in his home approximately once a month from November 1967 until July 2006, and twice monthly since. In 1993 he married Lee Uba (née Elisabeth Swanson).

Bibliography

Novels
 Rosinante
 Revolution from Rosinante (1981)
 Long Shot for Rosinante (1981)
 The Pirates of Rosinante (1982)
The End of the Empire (1983)
 Wizenbeak (a fantasy trilogy)
 Wizenbeak (1986)
 The Shadow Shaia (1990)
 The Lord of the Troll-Bats (1992)

Short-stories
 Demarche to Iran (1992) (collected in Mike Resnick's alternate history anthology Alternate Presidents)

References

External links

1931 births
Living people
20th-century American novelists
American male novelists
American science fiction writers
Hugo Award-winning artists
John W. Campbell Award for Best New Writer winners
Writers from Bangor, Maine
20th-century American male writers
Novelists from Maine